Perry W. Morton (June 28, 1907 – January 15, 1967) was an American attorney who served as the United States Assistant Attorney General for the Environment and Natural Resources from 1953 to 1961.

References

1907 births
1967 deaths
United States Assistant Attorneys General for the Environment and Natural Resources Division
Eisenhower administration personnel